Alicia Molik was the incumbent champion, but did not compete in 2004.

Amy Frazier won the title by defeating Shinobu Asagoe 6–3, 6–3 in the final.

Seeds

Draw

Finals

Top half

Bottom half

References
 Official results archive (ITF)
 Official results archive (WTA)

2004 WTA Tour